The 2017 Ole Miss Rebels football team represented the University of Mississippi in the 2017 NCAA Division I FBS football season. The Rebels played their home games at Vaught–Hemingway Stadium in Oxford, Mississippi and competed in the Western Division of the Southeastern Conference (SEC). They were led by then-interim head coach Matt Luke. They finished the season 6–6, 3–5 in SEC play to finish in sixth place in the Western Division.

On February 22, 2017, the University of Mississippi self-imposed a one-year ban from post-season play on the Ole Miss football team for the 2017 season, due to alleged NCAA violations. On July 20, 2017, head coach Hugh Freeze resigned in the wake of allegations about repeated calls to a female escort service from his school-issued cell phone. He was given the ultimatum, either resign or be fired.

Roster

Depth chart

Recruiting

Recruits

The Rebels signed a total of 23 recruits.

Personnel

Coaching staff
 Matt Luke, Interim Head Coach
 Phil Longo, Assistant Coach/Offensive Coordinator/Quarterbacks
 Wesley McGriff, Assistant Coach/Defensive Coordinator
 Maurice Harris, Assistant Coach/Recruiting Coordinator For Offense/Tight Ends
 Jason Jones, Assistant Coach/Co-Defensive Coordinator/Secondary
 Jack Bicknell Jr., Assistant Coach/Offensive Line
 Derrick Nix, Assistant Coach/Running Backs
 Jacob Peeler, Assistant Coach/Wide Receivers
 Bradley Dale Peveto, Assistant Coach/Linebackers and Special Teams
 Freddie Roach, Assistant Coach/Defensive Line

Coaching staff changes
After the conclusion of the 2016 season, adjustments throughout the coaching staff were made. After defensive coordinator Dave Wommack announced his retirement from coaching, offensive coordinator Dan Werner was fired. The team would hire Wesley McGriff to replace Wommack as the defensive coordinator, Jacob Peeler to replace Grant Heard as the wide receivers coach, Tray Scott to replace Chris Kiffin as the defensive line coach, and Wesley McGriff (who took over as the defensive coordinator) to also coach the safeties, replacing safeties coach Corey Batoon. Also, assistant athletics director Barney Farrar was relieved of his duties.

NCAA investigation
Following a lengthy investigation, the NCAA issued a Notice of Allegations against the Ole Miss football program in January 2016. The university announced that it had received an amended Notice of Allegations on February 22, 2017.

In total, the NCAA brought 21 distinct charges against the football program, individual coaches and athletic department officials, and boosters. These include fifteen Level I violations (the most serious).

Four of the eleven Level I violations occurred or involved coaches employed prior to Coach Hugh Freeze's tenure. The Level I offenses include:
 Two former coaches conspired with an ACT testing supervisor to manipulate tests so prospective players could qualify.
 Coaches arranged for a booster to provide "free housing, meals and transportation to then football prospective student-athletes" in connection with a program established to help prospects qualify under NCAA guidelines.
 A "huddle leader" who was also a booster under NCAA guidelines provided numerous impermissible benefits to three prospects in 2012 and 2013, including paying for several trips to Ole Miss, lodging, game tickets and concessions, merchandise, tutoring assistance, and ACT exam preparation.
 A booster gave a football player's family member $800.
 A booster provided at least three different prospects with free athletic merchandise.
 A hotel owner in Oxford provided impermissible lodging to various prospects and their friends and family members.
 Two boosters (Boosters 12 and 14) had several improper contacts with a prospect (Student-Athlete 39) and made multiple cash payments to him, totaling between $13,000 and $15,600. The NCAA alleges that an Ole Miss assistant athletic director "initiated and facilitated [Booster 12] and [Booster 14’s] recruiting contact and communication with [Student-Athlete 39], and knew at the time that [Booster 12] and [Booster 14] provided [Student-Athlete 39] with cash payments."
 This assistant athletic director intentionally misled the NCAA concerning these allegations.
 Hugh Freeze "violated NCAA head coach responsibility legislation as he is presumed responsible" for 16 violations "and did not rebut that presumption."
 "[B]etween May and June 2010 and from May 2012 through January 2016, the institution failed to exercise institutional control and monitor the conduct and administration of its athletics program."
Ole Miss announced several self-imposed penalties in May 2017, including a post-season ban in 2017, three years of probation, a reduction of 11 scholarships, and a variety of recruiting restrictions.

The NCAA Committee on Infractions hearing concluded on September 12, 2017.

Schedule
Ole Miss announced its 2017 football schedule on September 13, 2016. The 2017 schedule consists of 7 home and 5 away games in the regular season. The Rebels will host SEC foes Arkansas, LSU, Texas A&M, and Vanderbilt, and will travel to Alabama, Auburn, Kentucky, and Mississippi State.

The Rebels will host three of the four non-conference opponents, Louisiana–Lafayette (ULL) and South Alabama which are both in the Sun Belt Conference and Tennessee-Martin (UT Martin) from the Ohio Valley Conference and will travel to Berkeley to play their first ever Pac-12 Conference opponent, the
California Golden Bears.

References

Ole Miss
Ole Miss Rebels football seasons
Ole Miss Rebels football